The 1996 South Australian National Football League season was the 117th season of the top-level Australian rules football competition in South Australia.

The season opened on 30 March and concluded on 6 October with the Grand Final, in which  went on to record its 34th premiership, defeating  by 36 points.

The 1996 SANFL season marked the end of an era for Port Adelaide being their last year in the SANFL, as the Port Adelaide Football Club joined the AFL in 1997.

Premiership season

Round 1

Round 2

Ladder

Finals series

Elimination and qualifying Finals

Semi-finals

Preliminary final

Grand Final

Attendances

By Club

References 

 https://web.archive.org/web/20141205163141/http://australianfootball.com/seasons/season/SANFL/1996/

SANFL
South Australian National Football League seasons